Uragasmanhandiya is a town in Galle District, Southern Province, Sri Lanka.

Populated places in Galle District